Holy Ghost Church is a Roman Catholic church in Basingstoke, Hampshire, England. It was built from 1902 to 1903 by the priest and architect Alexander Scoles in the Gothic Revival style. It was named after the old ruined medieval Chapel of the Holy Ghost in the town. It is located on the corner of Chapel Hill and Sherborne Road, north of Basingstoke railway station near the town centre. According to Historic England, the church was "the last and best work" of Alexander Scoles. He is buried there and it is a Grade II listed building.

History

Foundation

From the early 1800s, priests came from Woolhampton to celebrate Mass in Basingstoke for the local Catholic population. In 1875, John Soper, a local non-Catholic dignitary, allowed for the current site of the church, next to the cemetery to be a Catholic church and school. In 1877, Holy Ghost Chapel and a schoolroom were opened on the site.

Construction
In 1901, Canon Alexander Scoles came to Basingstoke. He was the son of the architect Joseph John Scoles, and brother of the Jesuit priest and architect Ignatius Scoles. He was previously in the Diocese of Clifton, had already designed many other Catholic churches and came to Basingstoke to design, build and be the priest at a new church. He paid for the construction of Holy Ghost Church. In 1902, the foundation stone of the church was laid. In 1903, the church was opened. The old Holy Ghost Chapel became the parish hall. The interior of the church was decorated by Nathaniel Westlake. In 1920, Canon Scoles died and is buried in the church. The cemetery next to the church contains the graves of Dorothy Liddell and John Aidan Liddell.

Parish
Holy Ghost Church is in the Holy Ghost Parish with St Bede's Church on Popley Way, Basingstoke. Holy Ghost no longer has a Sunday Mass, instead it occasionally has weekday Masses.

See also
 Roman Catholic Diocese of Portsmouth

References

External links
 

Basingstoke
Grade II listed churches in Hampshire
Grade II listed Roman Catholic churches in England
Roman Catholic churches in Hampshire
Gothic Revival church buildings in England
Gothic Revival architecture in Hampshire
20th-century Roman Catholic church buildings in the United Kingdom
Roman Catholic churches completed in 1903
1877 establishments in England
Religious organizations established in 1877